Pallavi Chatterjee (born 30 October 1965) is an Indian actress and producer who is known for her works in Bollywood and Bengali Film Industry. She is best known for her role as Brinda in Rituparno Ghosh's Dosar (2006). She is the recipient of Kalakar Awards for two times.

Born to the ace actor Biswajit Chatterjee, Chatterjee made her acting debut with a role in a Bengali TV series in 1986. Her first big screen venture was Sujit Guha's Amar Prem (1989) that stars her brother Prosenjit Chatterjee and Juhi Chawla as the protagonists. She made her Bollywood debut with Vinod Talwar's Teri Talash Mein (1990) but the film never took off her career in Bollywood.

Filmography

Bengali film

Web series 
 Amra 2GayTher (2021)

References

External links
 

1970 births
Living people
Actresses in Bengali cinema
Indian film actresses
Actresses from Kolkata
Bengali actresses
Bengali television actresses